The United States Custom House, Court House, and Post Office was a federal government building from the 1870s to 1896 in the block bounded by Adams Street, Jackson Boulevard, Dearborn Street, and Clark Street in the Chicago Loop

History 
The supervising architect was James G. Gill.  It was completed in 1880, but already occupied by 1879.

Federal courts meeting in this building were the United States District Court for the Northern District of Illinois (1879 to 1894), the United States Circuit Court for the Northern District of Illinois (1879 to 1894), and the United States Court of Appeals for the Seventh Circuit from 1891 to 1894.

This federal building was poorly-planned and poorly-built, and by the 1890s was considered dangerous and too small.  The building was razed in 1896, and its stone shipped by rail to Milwaukee, where it was used to build the Basilica of St. Josaphat.  The Chicago Federal Building was then built on the same site, and for similar purposes, from 1898 and 1905.

References

Government buildings completed in 1880
Buildings and structures demolished in 1896
Central Chicago
Custom houses in the United States
Demolished buildings and structures in Chicago
Former courthouses in Illinois
Government buildings in Chicago
Post office buildings in Illinois